Dharani Dharan is an Indian film director and screenwriter, working primarily in the Tamil film industry.

Career
After quitting his IT job he worked as an assistant director for Susi Ganesan in Kanthaswamy. he made his directorial debut with Burma in 2014. His second directorial venture Jackson Durai is a horror comedy  released in July 2016 under Sri Green Productions. His third directorial venture Raja Ranguski is a murder mystery, music composed by Yuvan Shankar Raja and produced under his own banner "Burma Talkies", released in September 2018. His Fourth directorial venture Ranger is a Tiger based movie, Shoot completed by Feb 2020, now movie in the post-production stage.

Filmography

References

External links
 

Tamil film directors
Tamil screenwriters
Living people
Year of birth missing (living people)